Critical Public Health is a quarterly peer-reviewed public health journal. It was established in 1979 as Radical Community Medicine, obtaining its current name in 1990. It is published by Routledge and the editors-in-chief are Judith Green (King's College London) and Lindsay McLaren (University of Calgary).  According to the Journal Citation Reports, the journal has a 2017 impact factor of 2.412.

References

External links

Routledge academic journals
Public health journals
Quarterly journals
Publications established in 1979
English-language journals